John Lowe (born 13 April 1942) is an English pianist. In the late-1950s, he played piano for The Quarrymen, the group who would evolve into The Beatles.

Early career
Known to his friends as "Duff", Lowe had known Paul McCartney since 1953, and was invited to play piano with The Quarrymen by McCartney in February 1958.
He was in The Quarrymen for two years, and was there when the band recorded a couple of songs for a vanity disc at Percy Phillips' home studio in Liverpool. The two tracks cut that day were "That'll Be the Day" and "In Spite of All the Danger". Lowe maintained possession of the tracks and, in 1981, sold the recordings to Paul McCartney. Their estimated value was around £12,000. McCartney had the record remastered and the songs appear on The Beatles' Anthology 1 album.

Later career
In 1994, John Lowe played again with The Quarrymen for the album Open For Engagements. Of the 1994 lineup, only Rod Davis (guitar) and Lowe (piano) played for The Quarrymen in the 1950s. John Lowe, Rod Davis, Len Garry and Colin Hanton now perform as John Lennon's Original Quarrymen at Beatles events around the world.

On 22 December 2014, Lowe appeared on the BBC One programme, Would I Lie To You?, in which Ricky Tomlinson revealed that Lowe had left the Quarrymen to join the young Tomlinson's band.

References

External links

1942 births
English keyboardists
English rock pianists
Living people
Musicians from Liverpool
The Quarrymen members